Evaristo Isasi Colmán (born 26 October 1955) is a former football striker from Paraguay. Isasi was characterized by his phenomenal pace, dribbling and scoring abilities.

Career
He started his career in the youth divisions of his hometown team Club General Artigas of Mariano Roque Alonso. He had brief stints at clubs like Atlético Juventud in 1973 and General Caballero ZC in 1974 before joining Olimpia Asunción where he would spend most of his career and win national and international championships.

Honours

Club
 Olimpia
 Paraguayan Primera División: 1975, 1978, 1979, 1980, 1985, 1988
 Copa Libertadores: 1979
 Intercontinental Cup: 1979
 Copa Interamericana: 1979

National team
 Paraguay
 Copa América: 1979

References
Comunidad decana

1955 births
Living people
Sportspeople from Asunción
Paraguayan footballers
Paraguay international footballers
Copa América-winning players
1979 Copa América players
1986 FIFA World Cup players
General Caballero Sport Club footballers
Club Olimpia footballers
Association football forwards